Zavia T. Mayne is a Jamaican Labour Party politician currently serving as Member of Parliament for Saint Ann South Western.

He is currently Ministry of Labour and Social Security in the Cabinet of Jamaica under Prime Minister Andrew Holness.

References 

Living people

Year of birth missing (living people)
Members of the House of Representatives of Jamaica
21st-century Jamaican politicians
Government ministers of Jamaica
Jamaica Labour Party politicians
People from Saint Ann Parish
People associated with the Norman Manley Law School
Alumni of the University of London
Members of the 14th Parliament of Jamaica